Xeneboda congo is a species of moth of the family Tortricidae. It is endemic to the Democratic Republic of the Congo.

The ground colour of the forewings is ferruginous cream, densely strigulated and reticulated with rust and with brownish termen, parts of the costa and dorsum. The hindwings are orange, but brownish in the anal area.

Etymology
The species name refers to the name of the country where the species was found.

References

External links

Moths described in 2012
Polyorthini
Insects of the Democratic Republic of the Congo
Moths of Africa
Taxa named by Józef Razowski
Endemic fauna of the Democratic Republic of the Congo